is a Japanese billionaire businessman, the founder and president of Fast Retailing, the parent company of Uniqlo ("unique clothing"). As of October 2021, he was the richest person in Japan, with an estimated net worth of US$26.5 billion & 40th wealthiest person in the World according to Bloomberg Billionaires Index.

Early life and education
Yanai was born in Ube, Yamaguchi in February 1949. He attended Ube High School and later Waseda University, graduating in 1971 with a Bachelor's degree in Economics and Political Science. His uncle was an activist for the minority group known as Burakumin, who have continued to suffer caste-based discrimination in employment and marriage in modern Japan.

Career
In 1971, Yanai started in business by selling kitchenware and men's clothing at a JUSCO supermarket. After a year at JUSCO, he quit and joined his father’s roadside  tailor shop. Yanai opened his first Uniqlo store in Hiroshima in 1984, and changed the name of his father’s company Ogori Shoji to Fast Retailing in 1991.
He has stated: "I might look successful but I've made many mistakes. People take their failures too seriously. You have to be positive and believe you will find success next time."

In 2019, Yanai stepped down from the board of Softbank after 18 years as an independent director at the Japanese technology conglomerate.

Published works
One Win, Nine Losses (1991)
Throw Away Your Success in a Day  (2009)

Awards and honours
Yanai won the International Retailer of Year award for 2010 from the National Retail Federation in the US. He was the fourth Japanese national to win it, and the first since 1998, when it was won by Masatoshi Ito, owner and honorary chairman of the Ito-Yokado retailing group. He was also chosen as best company president in a survey of Japanese corporate executives by Sanno Institute of Management in 2008 and 2009.
In 2012 he was included in the 50 Most Influential list of Bloomberg Markets Magazine.

Philanthropy
In March 2011, Yanai donated 1 billion yen to victims of the 2011 Tōhoku earthquake and tsunami.

Personal life
He is the son of Kanichi Yanai and Hisako Mori Yanai. Yanai is married and has two sons, Kazumi and Koji, and lives in Tokyo. He lives in a $50 million, 16,586-square-foot house outside of Tokyo and owns two golf courses in Hawaii.

See also
 The World's Billionaires

References

1949 births
Living people
Japanese billionaires
Japanese businesspeople in fashion
Japanese racehorse owners and breeders
20th-century Japanese businesspeople
21st-century Japanese businesspeople
Waseda University alumni
Fast Retailing
Asia Game Changer Award winners